No. 36 Squadron ( or ) was a maritime reconnaissance squadron of the Finnish Air Force (subordinated by the Finnish Navy headquarters) during World War II. The unit was later reorganized into the No. 39 Squadron.

Organization

Winter War
1st Flight (1. Lentue)
2nd Flight (2. Lentue)
3rd Flight (3. Lentue)
1st Flight of No. 39 Squadron (1./T-LLv.39)

The Squadron was equipped with 6 Blackburn Ripon IIFs, 2 Koolhoven F.K.52s, 1 Ilyushin DB-3M, 3 Junkers F 13fes, and one Waco YKS-7.

External links

Lentolaivue 36

36